Gerhard Wieland (born 27 August 1944) is an Austrian former freestyle and backstroke swimmer. He competed in two events at the 1964 Summer Olympics.

References

External links
 

1944 births
Living people
Austrian male backstroke swimmers
Austrian male freestyle swimmers
Olympic swimmers of Austria
Swimmers at the 1964 Summer Olympics
Place of birth missing (living people)